The following lists events that happened during 1973 in Australia.

Incumbents

Monarch – Elizabeth II
Governor-General – Sir Paul Hasluck
Prime Minister – Gough Whitlam
Deputy Prime Minister – Lance Barnard
Opposition Leader –  Billy Snedden
Chief Justice – Sir Garfield Barwick

State and Territory Leaders
Premier of New South Wales – Sir Robert Askin
Opposition Leader – Pat Hills (until 17 November), then Neville Wran
Premier of Queensland – Joh Bjelke-Petersen
Opposition Leader – Jack Houston
Premier of South Australia – Don Dunstan
Opposition Leader – Bruce Eastick
Premier of Tasmania – Eric Reece
Opposition Leader – Max Bingham
Premier of Victoria – Rupert Hamer
Opposition Leader – Clyde Holding
Premier of Western Australia – John Tonkin
Opposition Leader – Sir Charles Court

Governors and Administrators
Governor of New South Wales – Sir Roden Cutler
Governor of Queensland – Sir Colin Hannah
Governor of South Australia – Sir Mark Oliphant 
Governor of Tasmania – Lieutenant General Sir Edric Bastyan (until 30 November), then Sir Stanley Burbury
Governor of Victoria – Major General Sir Rohan Delacombe
Governor of Western Australia – Major General Sir Douglas Kendrew
Administrator of Norfolk Island – Edward Pickerd
Administrator of the Northern Territory – Frederick Chaney (until 10 December), then Jock Nelson
Administrator/High Commissioner of Papua New Guinea – Les Johnson

Events
 10 February – Australia's first casino, the Wrest Point Hotel Casino, opens in Hobart
 28 February – The federal voting age is lowered from 21 to 18. The state of New South Wales had already enacted such a change in 1970.
 2 March – Wellington Street bus station in Perth is opened by western Australia's premier John Tonkin
 8 March – Whiskey Au Go Go fire
 1 June – The first General Dynamics F-111 aircraft is delivered to the Royal Australian Air Force
 25 August - Disappearance of Joanne Ratcliffe and Kirste Gordon
 20 October – Sydney Opera House officially opened by Elizabeth II
 1 December – Papua New Guinea is granted self-government prior to independence
 31 December – AC/DC perform their first major gig in Sydney Australia.
 Removal of "White Australia Policy".

Arts and literature

 Patrick White is announced as Australian of the Year
 21 September – The Jackson Pollock painting Blue Poles is controversially purchased by the Whitlam government for US$2 million (A$1.3 million).
 "No award" was made for the Miles Franklin Award

Film
 Alvin Purple

Television
 Certain Women (TV series) commences
The novel Seven Little Australians adapted for television (10 part series)
The New South Wales Rugby Football League negotiates its first television deal with the Australian Broadcasting Corporation.

Sport
8 September – Derek Clayton wins his fourth men's national marathon title, clocking 2:12:07.6 in Perth.
 15 September – Manly-Warringah defeated Cronulla-Sutherland 10–7 in the 1973 NSWRFL season Grand Final, claiming their second straight premiership. Penrith finish in last position, claiming the wooden spoon.
 Gala Supreme wins the Melbourne Cup
 Western Australia wins the Sheffield Shield
 Helsall takes line honours in the Sydney to Hobart Yacht Race. Ceil III is the handicap winner
 Australia defeats South Africa 3–0 in the Federation Cup

Births
 8 January – Jason Stevens, rugby league player and sportscaster
 17 January – Chris Bowen, politician
 22 January – Abi Tucker, actor and singer
 31 January – Portia de Rossi, actress
 4 February – James Hird, Australian footballer and coach
 5 February – Luke Ricketson, rugby league player
 6 February - Chris Wilmore
 15 February – Sarah Wynter, actress
 20 February – Kimberley Davies, actor
 26 March – Matt Burke, rugby union footballer
 13 April – Tammy Cole, field hockey defender
 19 April – George Gregan, rugby union player
 26 April – Stephanie Graf, middle distance athlete
 29 May – Malcolm Allen, swimmer
 12 June – Darryl White, Australian rules footballer
 21 June – Alyson Annan, field hockey player
 24 June – Matt Drummond, film director, screenwriter and visual effects supervisor
 27 July – Gorden Tallis, rugby league footballer
 2 August – Susie O'Neill, swimmer
 14 August – Kieren Perkins, swimmer
 20 August – Scott Goodman, swimmer
 22 August – Mark Hickman, field hockey goalkeeper
 2 September – Matthew Dunn, swimmer
 5 September – Jennifer Whittle, basketball player
 18 September – Louise Sauvage, wheelchair athlete
 22 September – Craig McRae, footballer
 8 October – Toby Haenen, swimmer
 14 October – Steven Bradbury, speed skater
 18 October – Stephen Allan, golfer
 23 October – David Beard, volleyball player
 31 October – Andrew Constance, politician
 6 November – Greg Warren, politician
 20 November 
 Sav Rocca, American football player and Australian rules footballer 
 Matthew Smith, field hockey player
 4 December – Steve Menzies, rugby league footballer
 24 December – Kerry Nettle, politician
 28 December – Alex Dimitriades, actor
 (Date Unknown) – Rodger Corser, Actor
 (Date Unknown) – Ann Shoebridge, milliner
 date unknown (1 January) – Catherine Freeman, athlete

Deaths
 5 April – John Coleman (born 1928), Australian rules footballer
 21 April – Arthur Fadden (born 1894), former Prime Minister
 8 July – Arthur Calwell (born 1896), politician

References

 
Australia
Years of the 20th century in Australia